Shevchenko is an urban-type settlement in Pokrovsk Raion (district) in Donetsk Oblast of eastern Ukraine.

References

Urban-type settlements in Pokrovsk Raion